Thomas John Quilty  (4 April 1887 – 1979) was an Australian station owner, pastoralist, philanthropist, and bush poet. To this day he still holds the record for the largest freehold land acreage in Australia's history; over 3 million acres (12,000 km²) for a single property.  In total, he controlled over 4.5 million acres (18,211 km²) of land. In 1976, Tom Quilty was awarded the O.B.E. (The Most Excellent Order of the British Empire) for his outstanding services to primary industry.

Early life
Quilty was born in Normanton, Queensland, to an Irish family with six children.  He began his career with his father and brothers Patrick (b.1888) and  Reginald (b.1894)  by buying large stations in the Kimberley region to run stock for the beef market,  breeding and training horses and cattle that could thrive in the harsh territory conditions.

Education
Tom received schooling at the family stations before being sent to boarding school (1904–07) at Nudgee College, Brisbane. After school he helped his father and brothers Patrick (b. 1888) and Reginald (b. 1894) to run Oakland Park and Euroka Springs, another station which the family had acquired north of Julia Creek. Robust and energetic, he honed his legendary horsemanship by riding with a band of wild young stockmen known as the 'Forest Devils'. In 1909 his parents and two of his sisters moved to Sydney. Property investment in Sydney further increased the family's wealth and in 1917 Quilty and Sons bought Bedford Downs Station, near Halls Creek, Western Australia, for £34,000. Patrick managed the infamous Bedford Downs Station while Tom Quilty managed both Euroka Springs and Oakland Park. The family continued to expand their extensive land ownership by purchasing Springvale Station in 1948, Springvale Station was a neighbouring cattle station to the already Quilty owned Bedford Downs Station. At All Saints Church, Roma, on 30 April 1919 he married fellow Irish native Charlotte Lillian Laura Isis Byrne; they were to have four children Roderick, Patrick, Irene, and Doreen.

Career as a cattleman
Quilty was an outstanding cattleman, an authority on the bush and northern Australia, a skilled 'poddy-dodger' and he could be 'a bit of a menace.' Generous with his fortune, but not one to give praise, he participated enthusiastically in outback social activities. He bred and trained his own stockhorses, racehorses and polo ponies. He was a proud and enthusiastic horse lover with his racehorse Proud Boy earning him honours on the racetrack.  He invested in the Kimberley Hotel at Halls Creek and donated money for a grandstand at the local racing club. To raise funds for the Royal Flying Doctor Service, he published a volume of poems, The Drover's Cook (Sydney, 1958). The poems dealt with station life, drinking, personal relationships, and raising children of mixed blood at Springvale homestead.  The poems are still in publication today. Tom Quilty is honoured for his immense contribution to the success of the Australian cattle industry and his notoriety as one of the most famous cattle barons in history through his inclusion in the Australian Stockman's Hall of Fame.

Charity work
A passionate horseman, in 1966 he donated 1000 pounds for the creation of a trophy for the Tom Quilty Gold Cup.  An event designed to test the skill of horse and rider it was awarded to the winner of a 100-mile (160 km) who could not only complete the gruelling course but whose horse also finished in sound health.  Quilty and his good mate RM Williams (the now famous boot and saddle maker) created the Tom Quilty Gold Cup a national championship endurance horse event, held annually in Australia which is now the biggest professional endurance ride in the Southern Hemisphere.
 In 1976, Tom Quilty was awarded the prestigious O.B.E. the second highest ranking Order of the British Empire honour for his services to primary industry.

After suffering a number of strokes, he resided at Oakland Farm near Capel, Western Australia.  He died on 24 November 1979.

References

1887 births
1979 deaths
Australian pastoralists
20th-century Australian poets
Australian male poets
Writers from Queensland
Australian people of Irish descent
20th-century Australian male writers
Australian philanthropists
Australian Officers of the Order of the British Empire